The ninth season of the American fictional drama television series ER first aired on September 26, 2002, and concluded on May 15, 2003.  The ninth season consists of 22 episodes.

Plot

For the first time John Carter becomes the central character and Noah Wyle receives star billing. The death of Mark Greene continues to affect his colleagues while a grieving Corday has left Chicago for England. She returns and a medical student raises eyebrows. The ER is still plagued by the smallpox disease at the beginning. Elsewhere Romano suffers a horrific injury which has consequences throughout the season, Weaver finds herself promoted, Abby's family troubles resurface, Pratt continues to get on the wrong side of his colleagues, and Kovač and Carter join a relief mission in Africa, setting up a continuing story thread for following seasons. Carter deals with professional and family issues while other staff members have their own problems. Over the course of this season, Romano suffers setbacks after losing his arm, Abby and Carter lean towards a relationship, Pratt has troubles in both his personal and professional life.

Cast

Main cast
 Noah Wyle as Dr. John Carter – Attending Physician
 Laura Innes as Dr. Kerry Weaver – Chief of Emergency Medicine
 Mekhi Phifer as Dr. Greg Pratt – Intern PGY-1
 Alex Kingston as Dr. Elizabeth Corday – Associate Chief of Surgery
 Goran Visnjic as Dr. Luka Kovač – Attending Physician
 Maura Tierney as Nurse Manager Abby Lockhart
 Sherry Stringfield as Dr. Susan Lewis – Attending Physician
 Ming-Na as Dr. Jing-Mei Chen – Attending Physician
 Sharif Atkins as Michael Gallant – Fourth-year Medical Student
 Paul McCrane as  Dr. Robert Romano – Chief of Staff and Surgery

Supporting cast

Doctors and Medical students
 Sam Anderson as Dr. Jack Kayson – Chief of Cardiology
 John Aylward as Dr. Donald Anspaugh – Surgical Attending Physician and Hospital Board Member
 Don Cheadle as Paul Nathan – Medical Student
 Leslie Bibb as Erin Harkins – Medical Student
 John Doman as Dr. Carl DeRaad – Chief of Psychiatry
 Michael Buchman Silver as Dr. Paul Meyers – Psychiatrist
 Scott Jaeck as Dr. Steven Flint – Chief of Radiology
 Bruno Campos as Dr. Eddie Dorset – Vascular Surgeon
 Matthew Glave as Dr. Dale Edson
 Perry Anzilotti as Dr. Ed – Anesthesiologist
Megan Cole as Dr. Alice Upton – Pathologist
 David Allen Brooks as Dr. Gunn
 Andy Umberger as Dr. David Harvey
 Dee Freeman as Dr. Lutz
 Randy Lowell as Dr. Dan Shine
 Christopher Grove as Dr. Marty Kline

Nurses
 Ellen Crawford as Nurse Lydia Wright
Conni Marie Brazelton as Nurse Conni Oligario
 Deezer D as Nurse Malik McGrath
 Laura Cerón as Nurse Chuny Marquez
 Yvette Freeman as Nurse Haleh Adams
 Lily Mariye as Nurse Lily Jarvik
 Gedde Watanabe as Nurse Yosh Takata
 Donal Logue as Flight Nurse Chuck Martin
 Dinah Lenney as Nurse Shirley
 Kyle Richards as Nurse Dori Kerns
Nadia Shazana as Nurse Jacy
 Bellina Logan as Nurse Kit
 Lucy Rodriguez as Nurse Bjerke
 Sumalee Montano as Nurse Duvata Mahal
 Gina Philips as Nurse Kathy
 Linda Shing as ICU Nurse Corazon

Staff, Paramedics and Officers
 Abraham Benrubi as Desk Clerk Jerry Markovic
 Troy Evans as Desk Clerk Frank Martin
 Kristin Minter as Desk Clerk Miranda "Randi" Fronczak
 Deborah May as Director of Nursing Mary Cain
 Erica Gimpel as Social Worker Adele Newman
Pamela Sinha as Desk Clerk Amira
Emily Wagner as Paramedic Doris Pickman
 Montae Russell as Paramedic Dwight Zadro
Lynn A. Henderson as Paramedic Pamela Olbes
 Demetrius Navarro as Paramedic Morales
Brian Lester as Paramedic Brian Dumar
Michelle C. Bonilla as Paramedic Christine Harms
 Julie Ann Emery as Paramedic Niki Lumley
 Chad McKnight as Officer Wilson

Family
 Sally Field as Maggie Wyczenski
 Tom Everett Scott as Eric Wyczenski
 Paul Freeman as Dr. Charles Corday
 Judy Parfitt as Isabelle Corday
 Frances Sternhagen as Millicent Carter
 Michael Gross as Mr. John "Jack" Carter
 Lisa Vidal as Sandy Lopez
 Marcello Thedford as Leon Pratt

Notable guest stars
 Chris Pine as Levine 
 Paul Hipp as Craig Turner
 Josh Radnor as Keith
 Crispin Bonham Carter as Passenger
Simone-Elise Girard as Nurse Gillian 
Pragna Desai as Dr. Angelique Chatta
 Bruce Weitz as John Bright
 Edward Asner and Liz Torres as patients 
 Patrick Fugit as Sean Simmons
 Katee Sackhoff as Jason's girlfriend
 Josh Hutcherson as Matt
 Nina Bell (credited as Nina Sablich) as Dr. Gordana Horvat
 Aaron Paul as Doug
 Amaury Nolasco as Ricky
 Jerry Trainor as Darius
 Michael Peña as Police Officer

Production
Original executive producers John Wells and Michael Crichton reprised their roles. Long-time crew member Jack Orman returned as executive producer and show runner. Previous executive producer Christopher Chulack remained a consulting producer while working on Wells' Third Watch. R. Scott Gemmill and Dee Johnson continued to act as co-executive producers. Medical expert Joe Sachs remained a supervising producer. Richard Thorpe, Joe Sachs, and Wendy Spence Rosato returned as producers. They were joined by new producer Bruce Miller. Eighth season executive story editor David Zabel and unit production manager Tommy Burns joined the production team as co-producers for the ninth season. New crew member Julie Hébert began the season as a co-producer. Zabel and Hebert were promoted to producers mid-season. Hebert left the crew with the close of the season. Teresa Salamunovich returned to the crew as an associate producer for the ninth season. She was joined by new associate producers Erin Mitchell (for the entire season) and Shelagh O'Brien (after the mid-season break).

Wells wrote a further episode for the season. Gemmill was the season's most prolific writer with five episodes. Johnson and Orman each wrote four episodes. Zabel and Hebert each wrote three episodes. Sachs and Miller each wrote two episodes. Yahlin Chang joined the writing staff as a story editor in 2002 and contributed to four episodes as a writer and twelve episodes as an executive story editor and one episode as a co-producer between 2002 and 2005. Wells was promoted to executive story editor mid-season but left the staff with the close of the season. New writer Arthur Albert wrote a single episode.

Producers Kaplan and Thorpe served as the season's regular directors. Kaplan helmed five episodes while Thorpe directed four. Chulack directed a further episode. Show runner Orman helmed a further two episodes. New producer Hebert directed a single episode. Returning director Charles Haid directed two episodes. Cast members Laura Innes and Paul McCrane each directed an episode, McCrane making his series debut. Returning directors were Félix Enríquez Alcalá, David Nutter, Nelson McCormick, TR Babu Subramaniam, and Alan J. Levi. Peggy Rajski was the season's only new director.

Episodes

References

External links 
 
 

Second Congo War
2002 American television seasons
2003 American television seasons
ER (TV series) seasons